Phyllostachys nidularia  is a species of bamboo found in Guangdong, Guangxi, Henan, Hubei, Jiangxi, Shaanxi, Yunnan, Zhejiang province of China at elevations below 1300 meters

References

External links
 
 

nidularia
Flora of China